Yakupovo (Yaqup) is a rural locality (a village) in Staroakbulyakovsky Selsoviet, Karaidelsky District, Bashkortostan, Russia. The population was 284 as of 2010. There are 5 streets.

Geography 
Yakupovo is located 18 km northwest of Karaidel (the district's administrative centre) by road. Tuyushevo is the nearest rural locality.

References 

Rural localities in Karaidelsky District